Job Pierson (September 23, 1791 – April 9, 1860) was an American lawyer and politician who served two terms as a U.S. Representative from New York from 1831 to 1835.

Biography

Born in East Hampton, New York, Pierson attended the common schools. He graduated from Williams College in 1811. He studied law in Salem and Schaghticoke. He was admitted to the bar in 1815 and commenced practice in Rensselaer County. He served as district attorney from 1824 to 1833.

Congress 
Pierson was elected as a Jacksonian to the Twenty-second and Twenty-third Congresses (March 4, 1831 – March 3, 1835). After an unsuccessful campaign for reelection to the Twenty-fourth Congress in 1834, he resumed the practice of law. He served as Surrogate of Rensselaer County from 1835 to 1840 and was a delegate to the Democratic National Conventions in 1848, 1852, and 1856.

Death 
Pierson died in Troy, New York and was interred in Oakwood Cemetery.

Notes and references

External links
 Job Pierson Family Papers at the Library of Congress Manuscripts Division. The Library of Congress holds the Pierson family papers, which consist of approximately 350 letters written by Job Pierson (1791-1860) to his wife Clarissa Bulkeley Pierson between 1831 and 1835. The letters, written during Pierson's two congressional terms, focus almost exclusively on political and social events in Washington. A passionate supporter of Andrew Jackson, Pierson filled his letters with accounts of the president and other major political figures, including Martin Van Buren, Henry Clay, Daniel Webster, and John C. Calhoun, and discussed the issues that dominated Jacksonian politics, including the Cherokee nation's legal status, the Second Bank of the United States, the Tariff of 1833, and the Nullification Crisis. The letters also reveal much about Democratic efforts to maintain party discipline in Congress, congressional daily work routines, Washington social gatherings, and the boarding-house life endured by many congressional representatives.

1791 births
1860 deaths
Williams College alumni
People from East Hampton (town), New York
Jacksonian members of the United States House of Representatives from New York (state)
19th-century American politicians
Burials at Oakwood Cemetery (Troy, New York)

Members of the United States House of Representatives from New York (state)